Music for Dreaming was founded by Cherie Ross in 1992 with the vision "to solve sleep problems, deepen the bond between mother and baby, and reduce stress in the most fragile infants."

In Music for Dreaming, the rhythm replicates the human heartbeat and its tempo is that of the resting human pulse. The continuous flow of the music creates a sense of calm and its duration is designed to support a baby's sleep cycle. Music for Dreaming is used in sleep clinics and specialised mother-baby units as a learning tool for mothers to settle their babies. In addition, the music is used during labour for pain relief, in breastfeeding to enhance the let-down reflex and to assist the newborn in nutritive sucking.

The music of Music for Dreaming is performed by musicians from the Melbourne Symphony Orchestra.

Discography

Albums

References

Organisations based in Melbourne
1992 establishments in Australia